The 1940 Cork Senior Hurling Championship was the 52nd staging of the Cork Senior Hurling Championship since its establishment by the Cork County Board in 1887. The draw for the opening round fixtures took place at the Cork Convention on 28 January 1940. The championship began on 10 March 1940 and ended on 29 September 1940.

Glen Rovers were the defending champions.

On 29 September 1940, Glen Rovers won the championship following a 10-6 to 7-5 defeat of Sarsfields in the final. This was their seventh championship title and the seventh of eight successive championships.

Results

Divisional section

First round

Glen Rovers received a bye in this round.

Semi-finals

Final

Championship statistics

Miscellaneous

 The 17 goals is a record for a final.
 Charlie Tobin's 6-00 (18 pts) is to the date the highest individual score in a final.
 Sarsfields seven goals in a record for a losing team in a final.

References

Cork Senior Hurling Championship
Cork Senior Hurling Championship